Bread for the World is a non-partisan, Christian advocacy organization based in the United States that advocates for policy changes to end hunger. Bread for the World provides resources to help individuals advocate to end hunger, which might include writing personal letters and emails to members of Congress, meeting with their members of Congress, and working in coalition with others.

History
In October 1972, a group of Catholics and Protestants met to reflect on how Christians could be mobilized to influence US policies that address the causes of hunger. Led by Arthur Simon, the group began to test the idea in the spring of 1974. By year-end, more than 500 people had joined Bread for the World to advocate for an end to hunger. Bread for the World was officially incorporated on August 3, 1982.

In September 1991, David Beckmann succeeded Simon as president of the organization. Beckmann retired in June 2020, and is succeeded by Eugene Cho, the founder and visionary of One Day's Wages.

Bread for the World is a founding member of The ONE Campaign.

In July 2020 Bread for the World requested and accepted the resignation of US Congressman Ted Yoho from its board of directors. In a National Public Radio interview about the resignation, the President of Bread for the World, Eugene Cho, said  "We have expectations for our board of directors. We are not an organization that demands perfection of any of us, because clearly we'll all fall short ... but we did feel that his [Ted Yoho's] comments were inappropriate, not reflective of the ethical standards and Christian values that we seek to uphold as an organization and for our leaders, and for our leaders." They were referring to reports that Ted Yoho called Alexandria Ocasio-Cortez "a fucking bitch", and "disgusting" on the steps of the United States Capitol.

References

External links 
 
 "Bread for the World is an Interaction Member Organization". Interaction.
 "Ending world hunger must remain an American priority". Des Moines Register (Des Moines, Iowa).
 "H.R.2817 - Roadmap to End Global Hunger and Promote Food Security Act of 2009: Endorsements for the report". United States House of Representatives.
 "S.Res.157 - Senate resolution recognizing Bread for the World for its faithful advocacy on behalf of people experiencing hunger and poverty". United States Senate.

Christian charities based in the United States
Non-profit organizations based in Washington, D.C.
Organizations established in 1982
Food politics